Spalding Hall is a building listed on the National Register of Historic Places in Bardstown, Kentucky. It was built in conjunction with the Basilica of St. Joseph Proto-Cathedral. The hall was originally built in 1826 and named for Bishop Martin John Spalding.

It was the main building of St. Joseph's College, a Catholic college in the 19th century, which was the first Catholic college in Kentucky.  The current building was built in 1839 to replace the previous building, which had been destroyed in a fire.  The college was closed during the American Civil War and the building briefly served as a hospital for Union soldiers.

It served as St. Joseph's Preparatory School from about 1911 until 1968.

The building houses the Oscar Getz Museum of Whiskey History and the Bardstown Historical Museum.

See also
 List of attractions and events in the Louisville metropolitan area
 National Register of Historic Places listings in Nelson County, Kentucky

References

National Register of Historic Places in Bardstown, Kentucky
University and college buildings on the National Register of Historic Places in Kentucky
1839 establishments in Kentucky
Buildings and structures completed in 1839
Federal architecture in Kentucky
Catholic Church in Kentucky
Education in Nelson County, Kentucky
Individually listed contributing properties to historic districts on the National Register in Kentucky